These are the official results of the Men's 200 metres event at the 1991 IAAF World Championships in Tokyo, Japan. There were a total of 61 participating athletes, with eight qualifying heats and the final held on Tuesday August 27, 1991.

Medalists

Schedule
All times are Japan Standard Time (UTC+9)

Records
Existing records at the start of the event.

Final

Semifinals
Held on 1991-08-27

Quarterfinals
Held on Monday 1991-08-26

Qualifying heats
Held on Monday 1991-08-26

See also
 1988 Men's Olympic 200 metres (Seoul)
 1990 Men's European Championships 200 metres (Split)
 1992 Men's Olympic 200 metres (Barcelona)
 1993 Men's World Championships 200 metres (Stuttgart)

References
 Results

 
200 metres at the World Athletics Championships